William Greenwell Ions (born 11 March 1994) is an English former professional footballer.

Ions was born in Ashington, Northumberland and played youth football with CD Tenerife, Newcastle United, and Leeds United. After being released by Leeds United, Ions joined the Nike Academy. He started his professional career with PS Kemi.

Early life
Ions, born in Ashington, Northumberland, moved to the Canary Islands in Spain with his family at a young age. While in Spain, he idolised England national team star Wayne Rooney and Spanish forward Fernando Torres to whom he compared himself to.

Club career

Early career
Ions first started playing football in the youth team of the local village of Valle de San Lorenzo in Tenerife, named "Constanza". Years later he started to play in the football school of Juan Miguel.

CD Tenerife 
At the age of 15, Ions joined the youth setup at CD Tenerife.

Newcastle United 
In February 2010, he returned to England to join Newcastle United, the club he supported as a child. He made his Under-18's debut in a home match against Nottingham Forest.

Leeds United 
Ions left on a free transfer to Leeds United in September 2012. While at Leeds, he played for the under-18 side. He started in a match against Sunderland and scored a goal.

Nike Academy 
Without a club, Ions joined the Nike Academy. During his time there he was mostly injured. While at the Nike Academy, he played in a friendly match against PS Kemi Kings whose attention he attracted after a good performance.

Palloseura Kemi Kings 
Ions joined PS Kemi Kings after his impressive performance against them in a friendly match with the Nike Academy. His manager after signing was fellow Englishman and former West Ham United defender Tommy Taylor. For most of his time at the club he has played on the left wing. In his second season at the club Ions helped PS Kemi reach promotion for the first time since 2011. In the 2015 season he had another successful year, gaining back to back to promotions with the club reaching the top division. Ions was voted best player of the league by other players at the end of the season.

Seinäjoen Jalkapallokerho 
On 11 August 2016, Ions agreed to move on loan to SJK for the remainder of the 2016, commencing on 21 August 2016. SJK also announced that Ions had agreed to join the club permanently upon the completion of the loan deal, for two-seasons.

Career statistics

Club

References

External links

1994 births
Sportspeople from Ashington
Footballers from Northumberland
Living people
Association football forwards
Association football midfielders
English footballers
Kemi City F.C. players
West Auckland Town F.C. players
Newcastle Benfield F.C. players
Seinäjoen Jalkapallokerho players
Veikkausliiga players
Ykkönen players
Kakkonen players
Expatriate footballers in Finland
English expatriate sportspeople in Finland
English expatriate footballers
Nike Academy players